Starlette (Satellite de taille adaptée avec réflecteurs laser pour les études de la terre, or ) and Stella are nearly identical French geodetic and geophysical satellites. Starlette was launched on 6 February 1975 and Stella on 26 September 1993. Starlette was the first passive laser satellite developed.

Background
Starlette's development dates back to at least 1972, when scientists at the Centre national d'études spatiales (CNES) were trying to determine a payload for the upcoming first flight of the new Diamant BP4 rocket. After consulting with the Smithsonian Astrophysical Observatory, CNES scientists decided to create a small geodetic satellite optimized for tracking by laser ranging. The project was approved within a few months after a feasibility study by the French atomic agency CEA determined the dense uranium core could be made nearly non-radioactive by using depleted uranium.

The Groupe de recherches en géodésie spatiale (GRGS; Space Geodesy Research Group) first proposed Stella to provide coverage for areas missed by Starlette.

Spacecraft design
This high-density spherical design reduced the drag effect of aerobraking on the satellites as they exited Earth's atmosphere. Both satellites are covered in 60 laser retroreflectors.

Mission and results
Starlette was launched on 6 February 1975 at 16:35 UTC by a Diamant BP4 rocket from the B launch pad at the Guiana Space Centre in Korou, French Guiana. It was the first flight of a Diamant BP4 launch vehicle.

Stella was launched on 26 September 1993 at 01:45:00 UTC by an Ariane 4 (Ariane 40 H-10) rocket from the ELA-2 launch pad at the Guiana Space Centre as part of a payload also containing the satellites SPOT-3, KITSAT-2, Itamsat, Eyesat-1, PoSAT-1, and Healthsat-2. The payload was located in the top part of the Ariane rocket's third stage.

In the 1980s, data gathered by Starlette was used to develop a model of global ocean tides.

Legacy and status
Starlette was the first passive laser satellite developed. The first of two American geodetic satellites called LAGEOS followed not long after in 1976.

Both satellites were in orbit as of 2021. They are expected to remain in orbit up to 2000 years and to remain trackable for many decades or centuries.

See also

 Satellite laser ranging
 French space program
 Timeline of artificial satellites and space probes

References

Laser ranging satellites
Satellites of France
Spacecraft launched in 1975
Spacecraft launched in 1993
Satellites orbiting Earth